The 2000–01 Karnataka State Film Awards were presented by Government of Karnataka to felicitate the best of Kannada Cinema released in the year 2000.

The awards were announced by the Minister of State for Information B. K. Chandrashekar, and M. S. Sathyu, the Chairman of the Film Awards Committee on 28 May 2001. Sathyu criticized the films of the year in that "most of the films were substandard and were marked by sex and violence. Women were depicted lowly, and most of the films had no message to convey leave alone being educative", while adding that the films also had "fascist tendency" in them. The winners were announced on 28 May 2001, and awards were given out on 16 December.

Lifetime achievement award

Film Awards

Other Awards

No Award
Committee not announce any recipients in following category
 Best Children Film
 Best Child Actress
 Best Art Direction

Members of the Film Awards Committee 
 M. S. Sathyu, chairman
 Indira Shivanna
 Vijay Bhaskar
 A. Rajashekar
 Geeta Nagabhushan
 K. Ramaiah
 R. Nagesh
 D. S. Nagaraj
 Somashekar

References

Karnataka State Film Awards